Zulhilmie Ijoi Redzuan is an international Malaysian lawn bowler.

Bowls career

World Championships
In 2020 he was selected for the 2020 World Outdoor Bowls Championship in Australia.

Commonwealth Games
Redzuan represented Malaysia in the triples and fours at the 2014 Commonwealth Games. Four years later he competed in the triples and fours at the 2018 Commonwealth Games; he reached the quarter finals of the latter.

Asia Pacific
Redzuan won a fours bronze medal in the 2015 Asia Pacific Bowls Championships and a double bronze (triples and fours) four years later at the 2019 Asia Pacific Bowls Championships in the Gold Coast, Queensland.

Southeast Asian Games
He also won two gold medals at the Lawn bowls at the 2007 Southeast Asian Games and Lawn bowls at the 2019 Southeast Asian Games.

References

Malaysian male bowls players
Living people
1986 births
Competitors at the 2007 Southeast Asian Games
Competitors at the 2017 Southeast Asian Games
Competitors at the 2019 Southeast Asian Games
Southeast Asian Games medalists in lawn bowls
Southeast Asian Games gold medalists for Malaysia
Southeast Asian Games silver medalists for Malaysia
Bowls players at the 2014 Commonwealth Games
Bowls players at the 2018 Commonwealth Games
Commonwealth Games competitors for Malaysia
People from Kedah